Taurida (also Tauride or Tavrida, from the ancient Tauri) is an old name for the Crimea. It may refer to:

Tauride Palace, palace in Saint Petersburg (built 1783–89), named after the Prince of Taurida
Taurida Oblast, province of the Russian Empire (1784–96)
Taurida Governorate, governorate of the Russian Empire (1802–1921)
Taurida Soviet Socialist Republic, ephemeral revolutionary state (1918)
Tavrida National V.I. Vernadsky University, also called Taurida University (founded 1918)
Taurien, a sub-district of the German Reichskommissariat Ukraine (1942–44)
Taurida Military District of the Soviet Union (1945–56)
Taurida fulvomaculata, a species of flatworm-like bilaterian native to the Black Sea